Daukšiai may refer to:
 Daukšiai (Kaunas County), a village in Kaunas County, Lithuania
 Daukšiai (Marijampolė County), a town in Marijampolė County, Lithuania